Aquidaban or Aquidabán may refer to:

 Brazilian battleship Aquidaban, see Brazilian battleship Aquidabã
 Aquidabán River in Paraguay

See also
 Aquidaba (disambiguation)